In medicine, Goodell's sign is an indication of pregnancy. It is a significant softening of the vaginal portion of the cervix from increased vascularization. This vascularization is a result of hypertrophy and engorgement of the vessels below the growing uterus. This sign occurs at approximately six  weeks' gestation. 

The sign is named after William Goodell (gynecologist) (1829-1874).

See also
 Chadwick's sign
 Hegar's sign
 Ladin's sign

References

Medical signs
Obstetrics
Midwifery